This list contains the resolutions of the UN Security Council connected to the conflicts in former Yugoslavia in period from 1991–2000. UNSC applied variety of decisions ranging from weapons embargo, economic sanctions, issues of formal recognition to establishment of no-flight zones and safe areas.

See also
 Yugoslavia and the United Nations
 Arbitration Commission of the Peace Conference on Yugoslavia
 10th NAM Summit decisions concerning Yugoslav Crisis

References

United Nations Security Council resolutions concerning Yugoslavia
Lists of United Nations Security Council resolutions